Michaël Jordan Nkololo (born 9 November 1992) is a Congolese professional footballer who plays as an attacking midfielder and forward .

Club career

Châteauroux
Nkololo began his career at Châteauroux and made his debut on 31 August 2012 in the 2–1 defeat away to Guingamp, coming on as a late substitute for Yohan Hautcoeur. He made a total of three league appearances for Châteauroux, whilst making twenty appearances and scoring six goals, including one on his debut against La Flèche RC, for the club's reserve team. He left in 2013.

Clermont Foot
Nkololo joined Clermont in 2013 and was a first team regular in the 2013–14 season making 32 appearances in the league, scoring once and assisting four times. Nkololo went on trial at Premier League club Aston Villa in January 2015. He departed Clermont in 2015, he participated in fifty Ligue 2 matches for the club across two seasons. He also scored three goals in nine games for Clermont II.

Caen
He joined Caen ahead of the 2015–16 Ligue 1 season. He played sixteen times in his first season for Caen, as well as five times in Championnat de France Amateur 2 for Caen II. After zero appearances in the first six months of 2016–17, Nkololo left Caen on 17 January 2017 to join Ligue 2 side Laval.

Hermannstadt

Nkololo played for Romanian side Hermannstadt in 2018, where he scored two goals: one in Liga I against Dinamo București, another one in Cupa României against FC Voluntari.

Istra 1961
In February 2019, Nkololo joined Croatian club NK Istra 1961 until June 2020.

Riga FC
In December 2019, he joined the reigning Latvian champions Riga FC.

FK Sūduva
In June 2021 Lithuanian FK Sūduva introduced a new member of the club. On 2 August 2021 he scored first goal for the new team in A Lyga against Kauno Žalgiris

FC Kyzylzhar
In February 2022 he signed with FC Kyzylzhar from Kazakhstan.

International career
Nkololo has represented DR Congo at senior level, he has scored two goals in four appearances for his country.

Career statistics

Club
.

International
.

International goals
. Scores and results list DR Congo's goal tally first.

Notes

References

External links
Michaël Nkololo profile at foot-national.com

1992 births
Living people
Sportspeople from Créteil
Democratic Republic of the Congo footballers
Democratic Republic of the Congo international footballers
French footballers
French sportspeople of Democratic Republic of the Congo descent
Association football forwards
LB Châteauroux players
Clermont Foot players
Stade Malherbe Caen players
Stade Lavallois players
FC Hermannstadt players
NK Istra 1961 players
Riga FC players
FC Volyn Lutsk players
Al Shaeib Club players
Ligue 1 players
Ligue 2 players
Liga I players
Croatian Football League players
Latvian Higher League players
Saudi Second Division players
Democratic Republic of the Congo expatriate footballers
Democratic Republic of the Congo expatriate sportspeople in Romania
Democratic Republic of the Congo expatriate sportspeople in Croatia
Democratic Republic of the Congo expatriate sportspeople in Latvia
Democratic Republic of the Congo expatriate sportspeople in Ukraine
Democratic Republic of the Congo expatriate sportspeople in Saudi Arabia
Expatriate footballers in Romania
Expatriate footballers in Croatia
Expatriate footballers in Latvia
Expatriate footballers in Ukraine
Expatriate footballers in Saudi Arabia
Footballers from Val-de-Marne
Black French sportspeople